Pseudonocardia adelaidensis is a bacterium from the genus of Pseudonocardia which has been isolated from the stem of the tree Eucalyptus microcarpa in Adelaide in Australia.

References

Pseudonocardia
Bacteria described in 2010